David Nicholl is a neurologist, human rights activist, fundraiser for Amnesty International, and online columnist from Belfast, Northern Ireland. In March 2006 he initiated a letter in the medical journal The Lancet, signed by more than 250 medical experts, urging the United States to stop force-feeding at the Guantanamo Bay Naval Base and close down the prison camp.  He is also a principal author of a reference work on neurological conditions 

Nicholl holds the position of consultant neurologist at City Hospital Hospital & Queen Elizabeth Hospital, Birmingham, and is honorary senior lecturer at the University of Birmingham.

Nicholl is a specialist in Parkinson's disease, and is best known scientifically for his participation in the project for cloning a gene, PARK8, linked with at least one form of the disease.

In 2014, Nicholl signed a statement of support for Moazzam Begg, following Begg's arrest for allegations of supporting terrorism in the Syrian Civil War in a case which subsequently collapsed.

He stood for the Liberal Democrats in Bromsgrove at the 2019 general election. He got 6,779 votes (12.5%), and lost to the Conservative candidate Sajid Javid.

References

External links
Nicholl's online column

Living people
Neurologists from Northern Ireland
Activists from Northern Ireland
Academics of the University of Birmingham
Year of birth missing (living people)